Honma or Homma is a Japanese surname. The choice of spelling for particular historical and modern persons is arbitrary.

Notable people with the surname include:

Homma spelling 
Chieko Homma (born 1964), former Japanese football player
Gaku Homma (本間 学 Honma Gaku) (born 1950), aikido teacher, student of Morihei Ueshiba
Hans Homma (1874–1943), Austrian stage and film actor
Isao Homma (born 1981), Japanese footballer
Kazuo Homma or Kazuo Honma (born 1980), Japanese footballer
, Japanese football manager and coach
Koji Homma (born 1977), Japanese footballer
Masaharu Homma (1887-1946), Japanese general
Munehisa Homma or Homma Munehisa (fl. 1700s), Japanese merchant, inventor of the candlestick chart
, Japanese Volleyball player
Shigeo Homma (1904–1974), Japanese gymnast
Shion Homma (born 2000), Japanese football player
Tomekichi Homma (1865–1945), Japanese-Canadian pioneer, and labour and human rights activist

Honma spelling 
Noriko Honma (born 1911), Japanese actress whose film work occurred primarily during the 1950s
Risa Honma (born 1990), Japanese singer and actor born in Tokyo
, Japanese ice hockey player
Satoshi Honma (born 1968), Japanese mixed martial artist
, Japanese ice hockey player
Teiji Honma (born 1911), ice hockey goaltender who represented Japan at the 1936 Winter Olympics
, Japanese ice hockey player
Tomoaki Honma, freelance Japanese professional wrestler
, Japanese ice hockey player
, Japanese rower

See also
Honma clan clan (本間氏) is a Japanese clan that ruled the province of Sado between the 12th and 16th century
Homma Museum of Art (本間美術館, Homma bijutsukan) opened in Sakata, Yamagata Prefecture, Japan, in 1947
Homma Elementary School, Richmond, British Columbia, Canada

Japanese-language surnames